Haim Harari (Shneur Zalman Blumberg) ( (July 13, 1883 – November 13, 1940) was a Hebrew teacher, writer, and publicist, member of the Second Assembly of Representatives, an amateur actor and director, one of the founders of the 'Hebrew Stage Lovers Association', and one of the founders of Tel Aviv.

His wife was the writer Yehudit Harari. His son was Yizhar Harari, a Zionist activist and Israeli politician, and his grandson is theoretical physicist Haim Harari, former President of the Weizmann Institute of Science.

References 

1883 births
1940 deaths
Hebrew-language writers
Israeli journalists
Israeli educators
Zionists
History of Tel Aviv
People from Tel Aviv
Burials at Trumpeldor Cemetery
Israeli male stage actors
Israeli directors
Jews in Mandatory Palestine
20th-century journalists